The Fleet Finch (Fleet Model 16) is a two-seat, tandem training biplane produced by Fleet Aircraft of Fort Erie, Ontario. There were a number of variants mainly based on engine variations. Over several years beginning in 1939, a total of 447 Finches were built, nearly all (431) of them for use as elementary trainers in the British Commonwealth Air Training Plan (BCATP) during the Second World War.

Design and development

The Fleet 16B Finch II was a progressive development of the original Consolidated Fleet primary trainer (Fleet 10), manufacture of which commenced in Canada by Fleet Aircraft in 1930. After a Royal Canadian Air Force (RCAF) evaluation in 1938 recommended a number of changes, a total of 431 Finch trainers were built for the RCAF between 1939 and 1941. The aircraft had conventional construction for the period with a welded steel-tube fuselage having Warren truss structure for its sides; and composite metal, wood and fabric design features, with Frise ailerons, a flat-bottom airfoiled, variable incidence (trimmable) lifting two-piece tailplane; and similarly "lifting airfoil" on the fixed vertical stabilizer, cambered into an airfoil on its port side only, to offset the P-factor of the propeller's swirling slipstream. The RCAF acquired the aircraft type as an elementary trainer. The Fleet 16 first entered RCAF service with tandem open cockpits, but the severity of the Canadian winter necessitated the introduction of a sliding canopy at an early stage in the trainer's service career.  The earlier Model 10's centre-hinged main landing gear radius rods were retained for the Model 16 series, as these centre-hinged units had replaced the "looped" left mainwheel's radius rod design that had been on the even-earlier Fleet Models 1, 2 & 7 biplanes from their own origins in November 1928.

Operational history

The Finch was a mainstay of the RCAF prior to and during the early part of the Second World War, flying at the Elementary Flying Training Schools (EFTS) in parallel with the better known de Havilland Tiger Moth, also produced in Canada. The earlier Fleet Model 7 (Fleet Fawn) was also in use for primary training. During 1940, initial production problems were solved and timely deliveries were made to the RCAF, allowing the first training programs to start up. In the following year, the Portuguese Navy purchased ten Model 16Ds (ordered as 10Bs but changed to the higher powered variant) and later a further five 16Ds were delivered in 1942.

A total of 606 Fleet Finches were produced as Model 16s, the majority for the RCAF. They were used as initial trainers in the BCATP at no fewer than 12 Elementary Flight Training Schools across Canada. Both the Fleet Finch and Tiger Moth were later replaced by the Fairchild PT-26 Cornell. The Finch was progressively phased out of service from October 1944 with the last of the Model 16s struck off strength from the RCAF inventory in 1947.

Variants

Model 10
Model was an improved Fleet 7 with a deeper rear fuselage from its nearly-level height dorsal turtledeck in side-view, a new two-piece horizontal tail/elevator and a better cockpit.
Model 10A
Model powered by  Kinner K-5 five-cylinder radial engine 
Model 10B
Model powered by  Kinner B-5, five cylinder radial engine
Model 10D
Model powered by  Kinner R-5, five cylinder radial engine
Model 10-32D
32-foot-long span wing for high altitude operations in Mexico. Powered by  Kinner R5, five cylinder radial engine
Model 10E
Model powered by  Warner Super Scarab seven cylinder radial engine
Model 10F
Model powered by  Warner Super Scarab seven cylinder radial engine

Model 10G 
Model powered by  Wright-Gypsy or  Gypsy Major inline engine, built under license in Romania at IAR, SET & ICAR factories, also used in Portugal.
Model 10H
Model  supercharged Menasco C-4S Inline
Model 16F
One prototype based on the Fleet Model 10; powered by a  Warner Super Scarab seven cylinder radial engine
Model 16R (Finch I)
27 built for RCAF; powered by  Kinner R5-2, five cylinder radial engine
Model 16B (Finch II)
Model 16D
15 built for the Portuguese Navy; powered by  Kinner B5-2, five cylinder radial engine

Operators
 
 Royal Canadian Air Force
 
 Portuguese Navy
 
 Royal Romanian Air Force
 
 Chinese Air Force

Survivors
Model 16
registration CF-AAE, serial 243, at the Reynolds-Alberta Museum in Wetaskiwin, Alberta and painted as 1001.

Model 16B
registration N666J, serial 350, one of two Finches based at the Old Rhinebeck Aerodrome in New York State since at least 1970, with at least three different color schemes in its four decades-plus of flying in Old Rhinebeck's weekend airshows. Since suffering a crash landing in 2016, the aircraft is awaiting a rebuild.
registration CF-GER, serial 399, at the Guelph Airport in Ontario and painted as 4488.
registration unknown, serial 542, at the Canadian Museum of Flight in British Columbia and painted as 4725.
registration ZK-AGC, serial 668, airworthy with a private owner at Omaka Aerodrome in New Zealand. For sale as of November 2020.

Model 16R
registration C-FDAF, serial 92319, at the Guelph Airport in Ontario and painted as 4494.

Aircraft on display
Model 16B
registration C-GQWE, serial 567, at the RCAF No.6 Dunnville Museum in Ontario and painted as 4708.
registration C-FFUI, serial 623, at the Canadian Warplane Heritage Museum in Ontario and painted as 4738.
serial unknown, at the Canada Aviation and Space Museum in Ontario and painted as 4510.

Specifications (Finch II)

See also

References

Notes

Bibliography

 Holmes, Tony. Jane's Vintage Aircraft Recognition Guide. London: Harper Collins, 2005. .
 Molson, Ken M. and Harold A. Taylor. Canadian Aircraft Since 1909. Stittsville, Ontario: Canada's Wings, Inc., 1982. .
 Page, Ron D. and William Cumming, . Fleet: The Flying Years. Erin, Ontario: Boston Mills Press, 1990. .

External links

 Old Rhinebeck's Fleet 16B Finch performing in flight, 2011 
 "Flying the Finch" - Bruce Paylor's RCAF 4488, 2008

1930s Canadian military trainer aircraft
Biplanes
Single-engined tractor aircraft
Finch
Aircraft first flown in 1939